Reye may refer to:

Douglas Reye (1912–1977), an Australian pathologist
Reye syndrome, a brain disease
Theodor Reye (1838–1919), a German mathematician
Reye configuration
Reye's hypothesis

See also
Reyes (disambiguation)